Julie Ann Sabo (born March 18, 1966) is an American politician and educator who served as a member of the Minnesota Senate from 2001 to 2003. Sabo was also the Democratic nominee for lieutenant governor of Minnesota in the 2002 Minnesota gubernatorial election.

Background 
A native of Minneapolis, Minnesota, Sabo received her bachelor's degree from Augsburg College and worked as a school teacher. Her father is Martin Olav Sabo. Sabo served in the Minnesota Senate from 2001 to 2003 as a Democrat.

References

1966 births
Living people
Politicians from Minneapolis
Augsburg University alumni
Women state legislators in Minnesota
Democratic Party Minnesota state senators
21st-century American politicians
21st-century American women politicians